1955 in philosophy

Events

Publications 
 Raymond Aron, The Opium of the Intellectuals
 J. L. Austin, How to Do Things With Words
 Pierre Teilhard de Chardin, The Phenomenon of Man (published posthumously)
 Herman Dooyeweerd, A New Critique of Theoretical Thought
 Volume II: The General Theory of Modal Spheres
 Volume III: The Structures of Individuality of Temporal Reality 
 Claude Lévi-Strauss, Tristes Tropiques
 J. L. Mackie, "Evil and Omnipotence" (in Mind)
 Herbert Marcuse, Eros and Civilization
 Paul Ricoeur, History and Truth
 Lionel Trilling, Freud and the Crisis of Our Culture 
 Simone Weil, Oppression and Liberty

Births 
 June 8 - Tim Berners-Lee, English computer scientist, inventor of the World Wide Web
 December 28 - Liu Xiaobo, Chinese literary critic and human rights activist

Deaths 
 February 17 - L. P. Jacks, English philosopher (b. 1860)
 April 10 - Pierre Teilhard de Chardin, French Jesuit theologian, philosopher and paleontologist (b. 1881)
 April 18 - Albert Einstein, German-born theoretical physicist (b. 1879) 
 September 30 - Louis Leon Thurstone, American pioneer of psychometrics and psychophysics (b. 1887)
 October 18 - José Ortega y Gasset, Spanish philosopher (b. 1883)

References 

Philosophy
20th-century philosophy
Philosophy by year